Richardson Devine Marine is an Australian company, situated in Tasmania on Hobart's Derwent River. Hobart is the capital of Australia's island state.

The company  specialises in the manufacture of aluminium passenger ferry and cruise/charter vessels as well as commercial work boats.

A number of vessels are based on designs from Incat Crowther.
The company has also paired with Off Shore Unlimited to produce a line of offshore working boats.

Multiple passenger vessels operate on Sydney Harbour, Sydney Australia, in the South West Tasmania World Heritage Wilderness Area, New Zealand, Japan and Zanzibar, Tanzania.

The company has received some support from Austrade through Export Market Development Grants (EMDG) scheme.

Awards
2009 Tasmanian Export Awards

Records

A world waterskiing record of 114 Skiers by the Horsehead Water Ski Club on 28 March 2010 was set utilizing the vessel Eagle.

This record was again broken utilizing the Eagle on 27 January 2012 with 145 skiers making the nautical mile journey.

Deliveries

As international deliveries of ferries is challenging, Richardson Devine Marine uses heavy lift ships like the Thorco Clairvaux.

References

External links
 

Companies based in Hobart
Shipbuilding companies of Australia
Shipyards of Australia
Companies established in 1989